Xuzhouxincun is a station on Line 1 of Wuhan Metro, opened along with the completion of Line 1, Phase 2 on July 29, 2010.  It is an elevated station situated on Jiefang Avenue, with proximity to Erqi Yangtze River Bridge, Wuhan Erqi Memorial Hall, and downtown bus transfers. The station has two side platforms serving trains from each direction.

Station layout

Facilities
Xuzhouxincun Station is a three-story elevated station built entirely along Jiefang Avenue. The station is equipped with attended customer service concierges, automatic ticket vending machines, accessible lifts, and restrooms in fared zone.

Exits
There are currently two exits in service:
 Exit A: Jiefang Avenue, accessible to Zhongbai Cangchu Erqi Shopping Center
 Exit B: Jiefang Avenue, accessible to Xincunjie Community Clinic and Wuhan Erqi Memorial Hall.

Transfers
Bus transfers to Route 3, 4, 211, 212, 232, 234, 509, 577, 615, 727, 809, Trolleybus Route 3 and 4 are available at Xuzhouxincun Station.

References

Wuhan Metro stations
Line 1, Wuhan Metro
Railway stations in China opened in 2010